KNLA-CD, virtual channel 20 (UHF digital channel 32), is a low-powered, Class A Multicultural Independent television station licensed to Los Angeles, California United States. The station is owned by Sovryn Holdings Inc, their Transmitter is located atop Mount Wilson.

History
The low power station started its life as KNLA-LP on channel 27, then eventually moved to physical channel 50, mapping to virtual channel 20, to make room for KHTV-CD in Los Angeles, California, until 2012.

The station started out broadcasting in Asian languages, similar to what KSCI and KXLA currently offer. Then KNLA changed its focus to target Los Angeles area residents of Central American heritage. (It is unknown when this change took place.) Most of these immigrants moved from El Salvador and Guatemala.  This channel was home to broadcaster ZionTV during its time of broadcasting in Spanish. KNLA also produced its own live, local newscast at 7:00 PM on weeknights, prior to affiliating with HSN.

Due to KNLA-CD and KSCI being under common ownership, some of the former's subchannels map back to KSCI using the latter's major channel number, 18.x, as shown in the table below, and the infobox to the right.

In 2017, KNLA-CD and sister KNET-CD entered into a channel-sharing agreement, with the latter selling its UHF channel 25 spectrum, but continuing to map to virtual channel 25. Please see the article on KNET-CD for more information.

In October 2018, KNLA-CD dropped its HSN affiliation and replaced it with SonLife on its primary channel 20.1.

Current status
The station's digital signal is multiplexed:

References
 Rabbit Ears website for KNLA-CD

External links

Crossings TV
CityTV

Armenian-American culture in Los Angeles
Asian-American culture in Los Angeles
Low-power television stations in the United States
Guatemalan-American culture
Hispanic and Latino American culture in Los Angeles
Indian-American culture in Los Angeles
Pakistani-American culture in California
Salvadoran-American culture in California
South Asian American culture
Television channels and stations established in 1993
NLA-CD
NLA-CD
1993 establishments in California